Brody Nelson is a character on CSI: Cyber. He makes his debut in the first episode of the first season "Kidnapping 2.0" Brody is a former hacker who is ordered by a judge to assist Avery Ryan (Patricia Arquette). Brody has a friendly rivalry with Daniel Krumitz (Charley Koontz). Brody is also in a secret relationship with Raven Ramirez.

Creation
It was announced on August 20, 2014 that Bow Wow (also Shad Moss) was going to star in CSI: Cyber. Hollywood Reporter used the term, "CSI: Cyber is going hip-hop". When speaking to Digital Spy, it was said, "Bow Wow is a gifted young actor who will have the responsibility, through his character, to set an example for young people who watch the show to 'do what's right' even when you know 'nothing but wrong." It was also said "It will be a redemption story and a cautionary tale all wrapped into one. The role of Nelson required someone with deep acting chops and off-the-charts smarts. Shad Moss is a unique talent that possesses both."
City Chile 
When speaking about his character Shad Moss said that Brody was "savvy, young, had swag... a lot of swag".

Background
Brody was formerly a black hat hacker, named "Qu35t", who got into the trouble with the law. FBI was close to throwing the book at him, until the judge made him work with them. Either he works with the FBI cyber division or he goes to jail for five years. Brody is trying to work hard to earn his redemption.

Storylines
In "Kidnapping 2.0", Brody joins the team and assists in stopping a baby-trafficking ring.
In "CMND/Crash", Brody finds it hard to separate his old life and relationships while having to begin a new life as an FBI Agent.
In "Fire Code", Brody discovered someone was using code he created in his illegal hacking days to create fires.
In "Family Secrets", Brody is seen in the opening scene spying on Avery but it is later discovered that he found out that someone was stalking Avery. Brody was also beaten up by the person stalking Avery and was found by Raven Ramirez (Hayley Kiyoko).
In "Why-Fi" it is revealed that Brody and Raven are secretly dating as they were shown making out in the shower.
In "Legacy", It is revealed 4 month's later, after a stint at Quantico, Brody returns to FBI Cyber Division as Special Agent.

References

CSI: Cyber characters
Television characters introduced in 2015
Fictional Federal Bureau of Investigation personnel
Fictional hackers